Muleshoe High School is a public high school located in Muleshoe, Texas (USA) and classified as a 3A school by the UIL. It is part of the Muleshoe Independent School District located in northwest Bailey County. In 2013, the school was rated "Met Standard" by the Texas Education Agency.

Athletics
The Muleshoe Mules compete in the following sports 

Baseball
Basketball
Cross Country
Football
Golf
Powerlifting
Softball
Tennis
Track and Field

State Titles
Speech & Debate Team
2013(2A)
Football 
2008(2A/D1)
Boys Cross Country 
1982(3A), 1983(3A)
One Act Play 
1983(3A), 1985(3A)

References

External links
Muleshoe ISD

Public high schools in Texas